Teen Summit is an American talk show for youth that aired on Black Entertainment Television (BET) from September 16, 1989 to August 31, 2002. In recent years it has returned as a very occasional special to the network's schedule.

Background
Created by Black Entertainment Television chief operating officer Sheila Johnson, and award-winning, originating broadcast producer Tony Regusters, Teen Summit dealt with the everyday issues teenagers face and attempted, often successfully, to bring them into perspective, and in a positive, uplifting light, while motivating teen viewers and their families to discuss the subjects presented on the weekly, one-hour, live show. After the original program host, Lisa Johnson, moved on in 1993, others filled the hosting vacuum, including Dajour Bullock and Ananda Lewis.

Cancellation and subsequent specials
After 13 years, Teen Summit was cancelled on August 31, 2002. Since then, it has returned twice, as a special called Teen Summit: Backstage Pass on June 21, 2007, then on June 25, 2017 as a part of that year's "BET Experience" festival in Los Angeles, hosted by Mindless Behavior's Princeton Perez.

Hosts and hostesses
 Adimu Colon  .... Host (2000)
 Jay Cooper .... Host (2000–2003)
 Dajour .... Host (1994–1998)
 Gabrielle Dennis .... Hostess (1998–2000)
 Fran Toliver Edwards .... Hostess (1996–2001) (as On Jam Fran) 
 Cinque Glendy .... Host (2002–2003)
 Belma Johnson .... Host 1994
 Marcelle Larice .... Hostess (2002–2003) (as Marcelle Kroll)
 Ananda Lewis .... Host (1994–1997)
 Lisa Johnson Smith .... Host (1989–1994)

Other performers
 DJ Cocoa Chanelle... DJ (1994–2001)
 Don Champion .... Correspondent/Posse Member (1999–2002) 
 Yolonda D. Coleman, Posse Member (1989–1994)
 Krystal Glenn .... Correspondent/Posse Member (1992–1995)
 Nicole Renee Harris ... Posse Co-host (1989–1992)
 Kenji Jasper ... Posse Member (1989–1993)
 Tisha Lewis .... Correspondent/Posse Member (1996–2002)
 Jacob Perez (2017)
 Derrell Ross (D-knott)...Dancer/Segment Co-Producer (1994–1999)

Posse / Squad Members

 Ajahmure Clovis
 Brandi Garrett
 Cheickh Aidara
 James Anthony
 Micah Baham
 Theresa Jackson
 Veronica King
 Stephanie (Staples) Hack

References

External links
 

1989 American television series debuts
2002 American television series endings
1980s American television talk shows
1990s American television talk shows
2000s American television talk shows
BET original programming
English-language television shows